Luis Manuel Menes Rivera (born June 2, 1993, in Guadalajara) is a Mexican professional footballer who currently plays as a forward for Zacatepec.

External links
 

Clubs
Club Zacatepec 2009-2012
Pioneros Cancun 2012
Club Zacatepec 2013-2015
Atletic Club Morelos 2016
Club Zacatepec 2016
Cruz Azul Hidalgo 2016-2017
Inter Playa del Carmen 2018

Living people
1993 births
Mexican footballers
Association football forwards
Club Atlético Zacatepec players
Ascenso MX players
Footballers from Guadalajara, Jalisco